Wilfrid Peter McKillop "Wilfie" Starr (July 22, 1908 – May 1, 1976) was a Canadian professional ice hockey forward who played 87 games in the National Hockey League for the Detroit Red Wings and New York Americans between 1932 and 1936. Starr was included on Detroit's 1936 team picture, but left off the cup.  He spent most of the season in minors, and did not play in NHL during the playoffs. He was born in St. Boniface, Manitoba to Samuel and Jessie Starr. He was married to Dorothy Kathleen McBride in 1931. He died suddenly at a Winnipeg hospital in 1976.

Career statistics

Regular season and playoffs

Awards and achievements
IAHL Championship (1936)

References

External links

1908 births
1976 deaths
Canadian ice hockey centres
Detroit Olympics (IHL) players
Detroit Red Wings players
Manitoba Bisons ice hockey players
New York Americans players
People from Saint Boniface, Winnipeg
Pittsburgh Hornets players
Providence Reds players
Ice hockey people from Winnipeg
Springfield Indians players
Stanley Cup champions
Windsor Bulldogs (1929–1936) players
Winnipeg Columbus Club players
Winnipeg Hockey Club players
Canadian expatriate ice hockey players in the United States